In the early Roman Empire, from 30 BC to AD 212, a peregrinus was a free provincial subject of the Empire who was not a Roman citizen. Peregrini constituted the vast majority of the Empire's inhabitants in the 1st and 2nd centuries AD. In AD 212, all free inhabitants of the Empire were granted citizenship by the Constitutio Antoniniana, with the exception of the dediticii, people who had become subject to Rome through surrender in war, and freed slaves.

The Latin peregrinus "foreigner, one from abroad" is related to the Latin adverb peregre "abroad", composed of per- "through" and an assimilated form of ager "field, country", i.e., "over the lands"; the -e is an adverbial suffix.
During the Roman Republic, the term peregrinus simply denoted any person who did not hold Roman citizenship, full or partial, whether that person was under Roman rule or not. Technically, this remained the case during the Imperial era, but in practice the term became limited to subjects of the Empire, with inhabitants of regions outside the Empire's borders denoted barbari (barbarians).

Numbers

In the 1st and 2nd centuries, the vast majority (80–90%) of the empire's inhabitants were peregrini. By 49 BC, all Italians were Roman citizens. Outside Italy, those provinces with the most intensive Roman colonisation over the approximately two centuries of Roman rule probably had a Roman citizen majority by the end of Augustus' reign: Gallia Narbonensis (southern France), Hispania Baetica (Andalusia, Spain) and Africa proconsularis (Tunisia). This could explain the closer similarity of the lexicon of the Iberian, Italian and Occitan languages as compared to French and other oïl languages.

In frontier provinces, the proportion of citizens would have been far smaller. For example, one estimate puts Roman citizens in Britain c. AD 100 at about 50,000, less than 3% of the total provincial population of c. 1.7 million. In the empire as a whole, we know there were just over 6 million Roman citizens in AD 47, the last quinquennial Roman census return extant. This was just 9% of a total imperial population generally estimated at c. 70 million at that time.

Social status
Peregrini were accorded only the basic rights of the ius gentium ("law of peoples"), a sort of international law derived from the commercial law developed by Greek city-states, that was used by the Romans to regulate relations between citizens and non-citizens. But the ius gentium did not confer many of the rights and protections of the ius civile ("law of citizens" i.e. what we call Roman law).

In the sphere of criminal law, there was no law to prevent the torture of peregrini during official interrogations. Peregrini were subject to de plano (summary) justice, including execution, at the discretion of the legatus Augusti (provincial governor). In theory at least, Roman citizens could not be tortured and could insist on being tried by a full hearing of the governor's assize court i.e. court held in rotation at different locations. This would involve the governor acting as judge, advised by a consilium ("council") of senior officials, as well as the right of the defendant to employ legal counsel. Roman citizens also enjoyed the important safeguard (against possible malpractice by the governor), of the right to appeal any criminal sentence, especially a death sentence, directly to the emperor himself.

As regards civil law, with the exception of capital crimes, peregrini were subject to the customary laws and courts of their civitas (an administrative circumscription, similar to a county, based on the pre-Roman tribal territories). Cases involving Roman citizens, on the other hand, were adjudicated by the governor's assize court, according to the elaborate rules of Roman civil law. This gave citizens a substantial advantage in disputes with peregrini, especially over land, as Roman law would always prevail over local customary law if there was a conflict. Furthermore, the governor's verdicts were often swayed by the social status of the parties (and often by bribery) rather than by jurisprudence.

In the fiscal sphere, peregrini were subject to direct taxes (tributum): they were obliged to pay an annual poll tax (tributum capitis), an important source of imperial revenue. Roman citizens were exempt from the poll tax. As would be expected in an agricultural economy, by far the most important revenue source was the tax on land (tributum soli), payable on most provincial land. Again, land in Italy was exempt as was, probably, land owned by Roman colonies (coloniae) outside Italy.

In the military sphere, peregrini were excluded from service in the legions, and could only enlist in the less prestigious auxiliary regiments; at the end of an auxiliary's service (a 25-year term), he and his children were granted citizenship.

In the social sphere, peregrini did not possess the right of connubium ("inter-marriage"): i.e. they could not legally marry a Roman citizen: thus any children from a mixed union were illegitimate and could not inherit citizenship (or property). In addition, peregrini could not, unless they were auxiliary servicemen, designate heirs under Roman law. On their death, therefore, they were legally intestate and their assets became the property of the state.

Local authorities
Each province of the empire was divided into three types of local authority: coloniae (Roman colonies, founded by retired legionary veterans), municipia (cities with "Latin Rights", a sort of half-citizenship) and civitates peregrinae, the local authorities of the peregrini.

Civitates peregrinae were based on the territories of pre-Roman city-states (in the Mediterranean) or indigenous tribes (in the northwestern European and Danubian provinces), minus lands confiscated by the Romans after the conquest of the province to provide land for legionary veterans or to become imperial estates. These civitates were grouped into three categories, according to their status: civitates foederatae, civitates liberae, and civitates stipendariae.

Although the provincial governor had absolute power to intervene in civitas affairs, in practice civitates were largely autonomous, in part because the governor operated with a minimal bureaucracy and simply did not have the resources for detailed micro-management of the civitates. Provided that the civitates collected and delivered their assessed annual tributum (poll and land taxes) and carried out required services such as maintaining trunk Roman roads that crossed their territory, they were largely left to run their own affairs by the central provincial administration.

The civitates peregrinae were often ruled by the descendants of the aristocracies that dominated them when they were independent entities in the pre-conquest era, although many of these may have suffered severe diminution of their lands during the invasion period. These elites would dominate the civitas council and executive magistracies, which would be based on traditional institutions. They would decide disputes according to tribal customary law. If the chief town of a civitas was granted municipium status, the elected leaders of the civitas, and, later, the entire council (as many as 100 men), were automatically granted citizenship.

The Romans counted on the native elites to keep their civitates orderly and submissive. They ensured the loyalty of those elites by substantial favours: grants of land, citizenship and even enrollment in the highest class in Roman society, the senatorial order, for those who met the property threshold. These privileges would further entrench the wealth and power of native aristocracies, at the expense of the mass of their fellow peregrini.

Land ownership
The Roman Empire was overwhelmingly an agricultural economy: over 80% of the population lived and worked on the land. Therefore, rights over land use and product were the most important determinant of wealth. Roman conquest and rule probably led to a major downgrading of the economic position of the average peregrinus peasant, to the advantage of the Roman state, Roman landowners and loyal native elites. The Roman Empire was a society with enormous disparities in wealth, with the senatorial order owning a significant proportion of all land in the empire in the form of vast latifundia ("large estates"), often in several provinces e.g. Pliny the Younger's statement in one of his letters that at the time of Nero (r.54–68), half of all land in Africa proconsularis (Tunisia) was owned by just 6 private landlords. Indeed, the senatorial order, which was hereditary, was itself partly defined by wealth, as any outsider wishing to join it had to meet a very high property qualification (250,000 denarii).

Under Roman law, lands formerly belonging to an unconditionally surrendering people (dediticii) became the property of the Roman state. A proportion of such land would be assigned to Roman colonists. Some would be sold off to big Roman landowners in order to raise money for the imperial treasury.

Some would be retained as ager publicus (state-owned land), which in practice were managed as imperial estates. The rest would be returned to the civitas that originally owned it, but not necessarily returned to its previous ownership structure. Much land may have been confiscated from members of those native elites who opposed the Roman invaders, and, conversely, granted to those who supported them. The latter may also have been granted land that may once have been communal.

The proportion of land in each province confiscated by the Romans after conquest is unknown. But there are a few clues. Egypt is by far the best-documented province due to the survival of papyri in the dry conditions. There, it appears that probably a third of land was ager publicus. From the evidence available one can conclude that, between imperial estates, land assigned to coloniae, and land sold to Roman private landowners, a province's peregrini may have lost ownership of over half their land as a result of the Roman conquest. Roman colonists would routinely help themselves to the best land.

Little is known about the pattern of land ownership before the Roman conquest, but there is no doubt that it radically changed after the Roman conquest. In particular, many free peasants who had farmed the same plots for generations (i.e. were owners under tribal customary law) would have found themselves reduced to tenants, obliged to pay rent to absentee Roman landlords or to the agents of the procurator, the chief financial officer of the province, if their land was now part of an imperial estate. Even where their new landlord was a local tribal aristocrat, the free peasant may have been worse off, obliged to pay rent for land which he might previously have farmed for free, or pay fees to graze his herds on pastures which might previously have been communal.

Enfranchisement
The proportion of Roman citizens would have grown steadily over time. Emperors occasionally granted citizenship en bloc to entire cities, tribes or provinces e.g. emperor Otho's grant to the Lingones civitas in Gaul AD 69 or to whole auxiliary regiments for exceptional service.

Peregrini could also acquire citizenship individually, either through service in the auxilia for the minimum 25-year term, or by special grant of the emperor for merit or status. The key person in the grant of citizenship to individuals was the provincial governor: although citizenship awards could only be made by the emperor, the latter would generally act on the recommendation of his governors, as is clear from the letters of Pliny the Younger. As governor of Bithynia, Pliny successfully lobbied his boss, the emperor Trajan (r.98–117), to grant citizenship to a number of provincials who were Pliny's friends or assistants.

In addition, bribery of governors, or other high officials, was undoubtedly a much-used route for wealthy peregrini to gain citizenship. This was the case of the commander of the Roman auxiliaries who arrested St Paul the Apostle in AD 60. He confessed to Paul: "I became a Roman citizen by paying a large amount of money." Inhabitants of cities that were granted municipium status (as were many capital cities of civitates peregrinae) acquired Latin rights, which included connubium, the right to marry a Roman citizen. The children of such a union would inherit citizenship, providing it was the father who held citizenship.

Constitutio Antoniniana (212 AD) 

In AD 212, the constitutio Antoniniana (Antonine decree) issued by Emperor Caracalla (ruled 211–217) granted Roman citizenship to all free subjects of the Empire, with the exception of the dediticii, people who had become subject to Rome through surrender in war, and freed slaves.

The contemporary historian Dio Cassius ascribes a financial motive to Caracalla's decision. He suggests that Caracalla wanted to make the peregrini subject to two indirect taxes that applied only to Roman citizens: the 5% levies on inheritances and on the manumission of slaves (both of which Caracalla increased to 10% for good measure).

But these taxes would probably have been outweighed by the loss of the annual poll tax previously paid by peregrini, from which as Roman citizens they would now be exempt. It seems unlikely that the imperial government could have foregone this revenue: it is therefore almost certain that the Antonine decree was accompanied by a further decree ending Roman citizens' exemption from direct taxes. In any case, citizens were certainly paying the poll tax in the time of Emperor Diocletian (r. 282–305).

In this way the Antonine decree would indeed have greatly increased the imperial tax base, primarily by obliging Roman citizens (by then perhaps 20–30% of the population) to pay direct taxes: the poll tax and, in the case of owners of Italian land and Roman coloniae, the land tax.

See also
 Roman citizen
 Pilgrim, from the Latin 'peregrinus'

Notes

Citations

References

Ancient
 Bible New Testament (late 1st century)
 Dio Cassius History of Rome (early 3rd century)
 Pliny the Younger Epistulae (early 2nd century)
 Tacitus Historiae (late 1st century)

Modern
 Brunt, P. A. (1971) Italian Manpower
 Burton, G. (1987) Government and the Provinces in J. Wacher ed. The Roman World Vol I
 Duncan-Jones, Richard (1990) The Roman Economy
 Duncan-Jones, Richard (1994) Money & Government in the Roman Empire
 Goldsworthy, Adrian (2005) The Complete Roman Army
 
 Mattingly, David (2006) An Imperial Possession: Britain in the Roman Empire
 Scheidel, Walter (2006) Population & Demography (Princeton-Stanford Working Papers in Classics)
 Thompson, D.J. (1987) Imperial Estates in J. Wacher ed. The Roman World Vol II

+
Roman citizenship
Social classes in ancient Rome